Snow Queen is a 2002 made-for-television film produced by Hallmark Entertainment and directed by David Wu based on the 1844 story The Snow Queen by Hans Christian Andersen. The film stars Bridget Fonda as the title character and Chelsea Hobbs as her rival and the story's heroine, Gerda. The film originally aired on Hallmark Channel as a two-part miniseries, but has since been released as a full-length film on DVD in the United States. The DVD was released in the United Kingdom on November 9, 2009 and in Australia on September 2, 2011. This was Bridget Fonda's last acting role before her retirement.

Plot
The film's story is roughly based on Hans Christian Andersen's story "The Snow Queen" but features a number of significant changes. Most prominently are that Gerda and Kai are openly romantically attached to each other, instead of simply being best friends. Another significant change is that the opening and ending portions of the film take place in a modern "realistic" setting, while Gerda and Kai's adventures are dream-like and surreal.

Gerda and Kai
Gerda, along with her father, Wolfgang, is initially in mourning over the death of her mother. The mother died nine years previously, freezing to death in the woods, and Gerda has grown to hate the winter because of this. The family has not been able to move on until Gerda meets Kai. In this version, Kai, rather than being a childhood friend, is the new bellboy at the hotel owned by Gerda's father, and he immediately sets out to befriend Gerda and help her heal, convincing her to take up her childhood hobby of ice skating once more. Over the course of their friendship, the two soon fall in love. It is because Kai has helped Gerda find new purpose in life that she sets out to rescue him when he is kidnapped by the Snow Queen. The Snow Queen refers to Gerda and Kai's relationship as "true love."

The Snow Queen
The Snow Queen in this version is intentionally malicious towards Gerda and desires to keep Kai for herself. Throughout the movie it is slowly revealed that the Snow Queen has been hoarding power for some time, intending to destroy all the other seasons and ruling the earth alone. She intended to achieve this goal using the Devil's mirror, a beautiful full-length mirror that was shattered into thousands of pieces above the earth. The Snow Queen initially kidnaps Kai because the final piece of the mirror fell into his eye, but she takes him to her palace and charges him to fix the mirror the way it was. Additionally, during the opening scenes, split-second flashes of the Snow Queen during the sequence where Gerda's mother is alone in the forest imply that she was the direct cause of Gerda's mother's death, possibly because she was a magically inclined rival of the Snow Queen, and indeed, Gerda's mother's brooch, which Gerda carries throughout her journey, has the magic and warmth needed to defeat the Snow Queen. There is also a minor sub-plot involving a fierce talking polar bear who is the Snow Queen's henchman, and stays by her side because he is in love with her. After her defeat he carries her away into her castle, and is seen taking the form of an elegantly dressed man (credited as the 'Polar Bear Prince.')

The Four Seasons: Spring, Summer, Autumn, Winter
Various characters that Gerda meets in the original story have been altered. The witch of eternal summer has become the motherly "Spring Witch," the prince and princess of the palace have been merged into the cunning "Summer Princess," and the Robber Girl's mother has become the fierce "Autumn Robber." In the film all three women are sisters of the Snow Queen who, like their winter sister with Kai, want to keep Gerda, albeit for various differing reasons. Together, the four sisters are known as the "Four Seasons". Gerda must escape from the Witch's cottage, the Princess' palace, and the Robber's camp, before she can reach the Snow Queen's mountain home and face the Snow Queen herself. It is stated in the legend that Spring, Summer, and Autumn have been severely weakened by Winter's attempt to take almighty power, and indeed, none of the other three sisters ever really show the same levels of power and magical influence that the Snow Queen wields over the course of the film. When they hold Gerda they explain that they are doing it to protect her, as their sister is much stronger than they can ever imagine, and that only they know the depths of the Snow Queen's cruelty and heartlessness. However, each of them helps Gerda on her quest in some small way, and just before the final fight between Gerda and the Snow Queen, visions of the Spring Witch, the Summer Princess, Chen (a young conjurer in the Summer Princess' court and a friend of Gerda,) and the Autumn Robber's daughter (who stopped her mother from killing Gerda,) along with a vision of her mother, encourage Gerda to keep going and that she knows what she must do to defeat the Snow Queen.

The Mirror
The magic mirror is the central piece of the plot and the catalyst for Gerda's adventure to rescue Kai. Listening to a legend being told to Kai by the Polar Bear, it is revealed that the mirror was forged by Satan, who gave it to the Four Seasons so they could admire their work. When Spring, Summer and Autumn looked into the mirror it reflected the essence of their power and the promise of life, while Winter saw a cold and barren world, which was the way of her season. Satan however had made the mirror twisted so that, as Winter gazed at her reflection, she desired for the power of her season to be absolute. Thus, one day, Winter steals the mirror, taking it to the Arctic wastes, where no one can find it. With the mirror now in her sole possession, she became the Snow Queen, and the world became colder. But this was not enough for the Snow Queen, since her sisters still lived, though greatly weakened. Taking the mirror up to the sky, she attempted to fly to Heaven itself, to demand that winter be made the dominant and unchallenged power on Earth. However, the magic of the demonic mirror and the magic of Heaven did not sit well together and the mirror shattered before she could reach Heaven, the glass fragments scattering to the four winds and starting the Snow Queen's quest for the recovery of the shards that fell into human eyes. After the Snow Queen's defeat, the mirror is seen sinking through the floor, possibly returning to Hell.

Cast
 Bridget Fonda as Snow Queen
 Chelsea Hobbs as Gerda
 Jeremy Guilbaut as Kai
 Robert Wisden as Wolfgang
 Wanda Cannon as Minna
 Meghan Black as Robber Girl
 Jennifer Clement as Spring Witch
 Kira Clavell as Summer Princess
 Suzy Joachim as Autumn Robber
 Duncan Fraser as Mayor
 Rachel Hayward as Amy
 Jessie Borgstrom as 8 Years old Gerda
 Robert D. Jones as Priest
 Alexander Hoy as Chen
 Trever Havixbeck as Sergeant at Arms
 John DeSantis as Satan

Production details
 The town scenes were shot in Fort Steele, British Columbia, a heritage town in British Columbia, Canada
 The interior of the White Bear Hotel was a set built on a sound stage, the same set being covered in synthetic snow for later scenes

Awards
Saturn Award (2003)
 Best Single Television Presentation - Nominated
Canadian Society of Cinematographers Awards (2003)
 Best Cinematography in TV Drama - Won
Leo Awards (2003)
 Best Female Lead Performance in a Feature Length Drama (Chelsea Hobbs) - Nominated
 Best Overall Sound in a Feature Length Drama - Nominated

References

External links

 
 
 Snow Queen at Hallmark Movie Channel

2002 television films
2002 films
Films based on The Snow Queen
Sonar Entertainment miniseries
Hallmark Channel original films
Films about witchcraft
American fantasy adventure films
American television films
Canadian fantasy adventure films
Canadian television films
English-language Canadian films
German fantasy adventure films
German television films
English-language German films
Films shot in British Columbia
2000s fantasy adventure films
Television shows based on works by Hans Christian Andersen
2000s English-language films
2000s American films
2000s Canadian films
2000s German films